Luis Varela (22 August 1941 – 25 June 2021) was a Uruguayan footballer. He played in seven matches for the Uruguay national football team from 1965 to 1971. He was also part of Uruguay's squad for the 1967 South American Championship.

References

1941 births
2021 deaths
Uruguayan footballers
Uruguay international footballers
Association football defenders
Peñarol players
Liverpool F.C. (Montevideo) players
Sud América players
Footballers from Montevideo